Metamora Historic District is a national historic district located at Metamora, Franklin County, Indiana.  The district encompasses 115 contributing buildings and 10 contributing structures in the central business district and surrounding residential sections of the village of Metamora.  It developed between about 1838 and 1923, and includes notable examples of Italianate, Gothic Revival, and Greek Revival style architecture. Located in the district is the Duck Creek Aqueduct. Notable contributing buildings include the Odd Fellows Building (1853), Gordon Hall Building, Jonathan Banes House, Metamora Masonic Hall (c. 1875), Martindale House (1838), Metamora Christian Church (1871), Redmen Hall Building (c. 1870), and Farmers Bank of Metamora (1923).

It was listed on the National Register of Historic Places in 1992.

References

Historic districts on the National Register of Historic Places in Indiana
Greek Revival architecture in Indiana
Gothic Revival architecture in Indiana
Italianate architecture in Indiana
Historic districts in Franklin County, Indiana
National Register of Historic Places in Franklin County, Indiana